Erigeron kiukiangensis is a Chinese species of flowering plants in the family Asteraceae. It grows on mountain slopes in southwestern China (Tibet and Yunnan).

Erigeron kiukiangensis is a perennial, clump-forming herb up to 55 cm (22 jinches) tall, forming woody rhizomes. Its flower heads have red ray florets surrounding yellow disc florets.

References

kiukiangensis
Flora of China
Plants described in 1973